Lia Gal Barkai (born 5 April 1999) is an Israeli footballer who plays as a defender and has appeared 9 times (till now ) for the Israel women's national team.

Career
Barkai started to play at the age of 8 for a boys' team in a township of Pardes Hanna, and after 3 years she moved to play for 2 famous local teams: Maccabi Kishronot Hadera and ASA Tel Aviv University. in 2015, at the age of 16, she accepted to the Wingate Institute in Israel. As a student, she played for the College Women Football Team, known in Israel as "The Academia" in the premier Israeli League. When she finished her studies at the "Academia", she started her mandatory service in the army. As she was recognized as an "excellence sport-person" (an official definition for several sport-persons that let them combine their service with the ongoing career) she continued to play for the ASA Tel Aviv University team. She became famous when the army refused to let her join the National Israeli Women team to the European Championship campaign in Spain, but the army regretted a day before the game, after the story got published in the Israeli media. She joined the team but was sitting on the bench during the match Vs. Spain. She continued and still is to play for 3 Israeli teams.   
Barkai has been capped for the Israel national team, appearing for the team during the 2019 FIFA Women's World Cup qualifying cycle.

Club's Honors and awards 
 2018-2019 - Israeli Championship with Asa Tel Aviv team.
 2018-2019 - The IFA Cup with Asa Tel Aviv team.
 2019-2020 -  Israeli Championship with M.C. Ramat Ha'Sharon.

International Record 
 3 appears for the Israel National Team Under 16.
 9 appears for the Israel National Team Under 17.
 9 appears for the Israel National Team Under 19 - all of them as the Captain.
 10 appears for the Israel National Team.
 5 appears for 2 local teams in the European Champions League.

References

External links
 .
 
 
 The story behind the screen of the game Israel Vs. Spain - see text above (a report in Hebrew)

1999 births
Living people
Israeli women's footballers
Israel women's international footballers
ASA Tel Aviv University players
Women's association football defenders
Israeli Jews